Avenue Pierre 1er de Serbie is an Avenue which runs through the 16th arrondissement of Paris, France, from Place d'Iena to 27 avenue George V.

History
 
Avenue Pierre 1er de Serbie was previously part of rue Pierre Charron, and before that a segment of rue de Morny (today part of Pierre Charron). The avenue was officially created on 14 July 1918. It was named in honor of Peter I of Serbia (1846-1921), last king of Serbia and first king of Yugoslavia, who volunteered to serve in the French Army, the French Foreign Legion, and was decorated with the French Legion of Honour.

Buildings of note 
 10 - Palais Galliera - Musée de la Mode de la Ville de Paris
22 - Les Films du Losange - Film company created by Barbet Schroeder and Eric Rohmer
 31 - CGPF (1937—1940); CNPF (1950—1998); MEDEF (1998—2003)

Closest transport 
 Métro - Iéna
 RER - Pont de l'Alma
 Bus - 32, 42, 63, 72, 80, 82, 92

Trivia 
 Mary Cassatt lived there in 1884.

References

Rue Pierre 1er de Serbie
Pages using infobox street with Paris-specific parameters